Kristel Pärtna (née Jõesaar; born 4 November 1981, Tartu) is an Estonian opera singer (soprano).

In 2011, she graduated from Estonian Academy of Music and Theatre in singing speciality.

Since 2012, she is a soloist in Estonian National Opera.

Awards:
 2012: Marje and Kuldar Sink Prize for Young Singer
 2017 Theatre Award of Harju County
 2020 SEB Pank Audience Award

Opera roles

 Euridice (Luigi Rossi's "L'Orfeo, immagini di una lontananza")
 Mandane (Johann Adolph Hasse's "Artaserse") 
 Norina (Gaetano Donizetti's "Don Pasquale")

References

1981 births
Living people
Estonian operatic sopranos
Estonian Academy of Music and Theatre alumni
People from Tartu